Dix's Grant is a township in Coös County, New Hampshire, United States. As of the 2020 census, the grant had a population of zero. In New Hampshire, locations, grants, townships (which are different from towns), and purchases are unincorporated portions of a county which are not part of any town and have limited self-government (if any, as many are uninhabited).

Dix's Grant will fall within the path of totality during the solar eclipse of April 8, 2024.

History
The eastern portion of the original grant (north of Wentworth Location) became present-day Dix's Grant.

Geography 
The township is drained by the Swift Diamond River and its tributary, Fourmile Brook. The Swift Diamond is an east-flowing tributary of the Dead Diamond River and part of the Androscoggin River watershed.

Demographics 

As of the 2010 census, there was one person living in the grant.

References

Townships in Coös County, New Hampshire
Berlin, New Hampshire micropolitan area
Townships in New Hampshire